Sechaba Brewery Holdings Limited is the investment holding company with 60% controlling interest in Kgalagadi Breweries Limited (KBL) and  Botswana Breweries (Pty) Limited. SAB Miller holds the remaining 40% minority interest.

It was listed on the Botswana Stock exchange on 19 Jun 1989.

Shareholder analysis
The main shareholders in SBHL are:

References

SABMiller
Companies of Botswana
Companies listed on the Botswana Stock Exchange